Viola Yanik (born July 9, 1982 in Bonn, West Germany) is a Canadian wrestler. She has wrestled since 1997 and is a graduate of the University of Saskatchewan. She won a bronze medal in the 63 kg freestyle event at the 2003 World Championships in New York City, New York and wrestled in the first ever Women's Wrestling at the 2004 Athens Olympic Games, placing fifth. She retired from wrestling at the end of 2005 to pursue other endeavors.

Personal life
Yanik is of Turkish origin. She is married to Tolga Yanik.

References

External links
 

1982 births
Living people
Sportspeople from Bonn
Olympic wrestlers of Canada
Wrestlers at the 2004 Summer Olympics
Canadian people of Turkish descent 
Canadian female sport wrestlers
Sportspeople from Saskatchewan
University of Saskatchewan alumni
Canadian people of German descent
Pan American Games silver medalists for Canada
Pan American Games medalists in wrestling
Wrestlers at the 2003 Pan American Games
Medalists at the 2003 Pan American Games